The Bukhansan National Park in Seoul and Gyeonggi covers an area of  and was established on 2 April 1983. Bukhansan means "mountains north of the Han River."

The park contains forested areas, temples and granite peaks. The three main peaks are Baekundae, Insubong,  and Mangnyeongdae, .  Due to its popularity with hikers and Seoul residents, some trails are closed on a rotation basis to protect the local environment.

A fortress was first built on this site in 132 AD to protect Seoul from foreign invasions, and it was expanded to its current size in 1711. It was reconstructed after damage sustained in the Korean War. Despite its name, this mountain is in Seoul, South Korea, so this mountain should not be confused with North Korea (also referred to as 북한, bukhan).

Name 
There is a current movement to have the name of Bukhansan reverted. For many years up until now, the three main peaks of the park have collectively been called "Bukhansan"; however, the original collective name of these three peaks was Samgaksan, meaning "three horned mountains". The Gangbuk-gu District Office in Seoul is leading a petition to have the central government change the name back to the original. Civilians, religious leaders, other district offices, and groups, such as the Korean Mountaineering League, are assisting in the lobbying to have the name of the three original peaks reverted to Samgaksan.

Features

Trails 
There are many trails and the most known routes include Baegundae (Hangul: 백운대), which is Bukhansan's highest peak at 837 meters, the fortress wall, and the Insu-bong (Hangul: 인수봉) which rises up to 810.5 meters. The 70 kilometer Dulle-gil Trail (Hangul: 둘레길) connects forested paths along foothills and villages, 21 sections out of total. Dobongsan (Hangul: 도봉산) is another popular entry point into the park featuring a trail that starts near Dobongsan Station. This hiking route features steep climbs using handrails and is a popular rock climbing area.

See also
 List of national parks of South Korea
 Tourism in South Korea
 List of fortresses in Korea

References

External links
The park's page on Korea National Park Service's website

National parks of South Korea
Protected areas established in 1983
Parks in Gyeonggi Province
Geography of Seoul